Alipate "Al" Korovou (born circa 1947 in Nasaqalau Lakeba, Lau Islands) is a Fijian professional middle/super middleweight boxer of the 1970s who won the New South Wales (Australia) State middleweight title, Australian middleweight title, Australian super middleweight title, and Commonwealth middleweight title, his professional fighting weight varied from , i.e. middleweight to , i.e. super middleweight.

References

External links

Image - Al Korovou
Article - Al Korovou

People from Lakeba
Living people
Middleweight boxers
Super-middleweight boxers
Year of birth missing (living people)
Fijian male boxers
I-Taukei Fijian people